

The Aerocar Micro-IMP was a light sportsplane developed from the successful Mini-IMP homebuilt. Designed by Moulton Taylor and Jerry Holcomb in 1978, it was finished in 1981 and demonstrated at Oshkosh the following year.

A unique feature of the aircraft was that it was built out of fibreglass-reinforced paper – it was intended that the aircraft "kit" would be marketed printed on paper. The builder would cut out the parts and laminate them between fibreglass mats to build up the structure of the aircraft.

The Micro-IMP was ultimately a disappointment because its powerplant (taken from the Citroën 2CV) proved unsuitable, and a projected higher-powered version of the engine did not eventually become available. Holcomb later built a refined version with a different powerplant as the Ultra-IMP.

Specifications (Micro-IMP, Citroën engine, performance estimated)

See also

References

 John W. R. Taylor. Jane's All The World's Aircraft 1982–83. London:Jane's Yearbooks, 1982. .

1980s United States sport aircraft
Micro-IMP
Aircraft first flown in 1981
High-wing aircraft
Single-engined pusher aircraft